Prakash Wakankar is an Indian cricket commentator. As a cricketer, he played for Maharashtra U-22. He has commentated for the BBC since 2009.

References

Living people
Indian cricket commentators
Year of birth missing (living people)
Place of birth missing (living people)